Koji Mizoguchi (born in 1963) is a Japanese archaeologist and a professor of social archaeology in the Graduate School of Social and Cultural Studies at Kyushu University. He studies the comparative emergence of societies in Europe and Japan and has a particular interest in the history of archaeology. He currently serving as the sixth president of the World Archaeological Congress, serves as director of the Advanced Asian Archaeology Research Center at Kyushu University, and is an elected fellow of the London Society of Antiquaries. He has been involved in numerous archaeological projects, and is currently a co-director (with Julian Thomas and Keith Ray) of the project ‘Beneath Hay Bluff: prehistoric south-west Herefordshire, c.4000-1500 BC.'

Biography 
Koji was born in 1963 in Kitakyushu, Japan. After obtaining his PhD in archaeology from the University of Cambridge, in 1995, he became an associate professor in archaeology at the Kyushu University's Graduate School of Social and Cultural Studies. He was promoted as Professor in 2013.

Awards 

 In 2006, he was awarded the Japan Society for the Promotion of Science Prize.

Works

Articles and chapters in edited volumes

Books

References

External links 

 WAC at 30: Give the Past a Future- Koji Mizoguchi's speech: https://www.youtube.com/watch?v=MdXjEwTIXxU 
 President's Opening Speech at WAC-8-https://www.youtube.com/watch?v=SNhV0m36aTc
 Article on the archaeological indicators of "polite society": https://theconversation.com/the-archaeology-of-polite-society-65958

1963 births
Living people
Japanese archaeologists
Academic staff of Kyushu University
Alumni of the University of Cambridge
People from Kitakyushu
20th-century Japanese scientists
21st-century Japanese scientists